Taraba is a state in the North East part of Nigeria with the slogan "Nature's Gift to the Nation".

The state has many tertiary institutions of learning existing there.

Universities 
The are three (3) universities existing in Taraba state, and one is owned by the state government, the other one by the federal government and the last one is a private-owned university. The universities are:

 Federal University, Wukari
 Taraba State University, Jalingo
 Kwararafa University, Wukari

Colleges 
There are many different colleges existing across the state. Below are the colleges:

 Taraba State College of Education, Zing
 Taraba State College of Agriculture, Jalingo
 Taraba State College of Health Technology, Takum
 Taraba State College of Nursing and Midwifery, Jalingo
 Peacock College of Education, Jalingo
 Muwanshat College of Health Science and Technology, Jalingo
 College of Health Sciences and Technology, Mutum Biyu

Polytechnics 
Taraba State has only two polytechnics, which are:

 Federal Polytechnic Bali
 Taraba State Polytechnic, Suntai

References 

Lists of universities and colleges in Nigeria